was a Japanese Tendai Buddhist monk of the Azuchi-Momoyama and early Edo periods. He achieved the rank of Daisōjō, the highest rank of the priesthood. 
His Buddhist name was first , which he changed to Tenkai in 1590.

Tenkai was at Kita-in (then written 北院) in Kawagoe in 1588, and became abbot in 1599. He was on the advisor of Tokugawa Ieyasu, and served as a liaison between the Tokugawa Shogunate and the Imperial Court in Kyoto. One of his projects was the rebuilding of Enryaku-ji, which had been devastated by Oda Nobunaga. He also revitalized Kita-in, and changed the characters of its name to 喜多院. Nearing death in 1616, Ieyasu entrusted Tenkai with his last will regarding matters of his funeral and his posthumous name. Tenkai selected gongen rather than myōjin, and after death Ieyasu became known as Tōshō Daigongen.

Tenkai continued to serve as a consultant to the next two Tokugawa shōguns. In 1624, retired shōgun Tokugawa Hidetada and ruling shōgun Tokugawa Iemitsu asked him to establish Kan'ei-ji, a Buddhist temple to the northeast of Edo Castle in Ueno.

There are several theories concerning his early life. Some fiction writers postulate that he was in actuality Akechi Mitsuhide. It is not certain whether Mitsuhide died at the Battle of Yamazaki or not, and some suppose that he survived and began a new life as the priest Tenkai.

In popular media 
Tenkai appears as the main villain in the first Sakura Wars game.
In the game Sengoku Basara 3 and the anime Sengoku Basara: The Last Party the character Tenkai is portrayed as a cryptic monk who speaks in riddles and wields twin scythes. As with the rumor above, Tenkai is actually a re-skinned model of Akechi Mitsuhide, from the game and anime's predecessor. As of the UTAGE upgrade of the third game, the series established both Tenkai and Mitsuhide as a same person.
In the Onimusha series, Samanosuke Akechi took on the identity of Tenkai in Onimusha: Dawn of Dreams.
In the video game Shin Megami Tensei IV Tenkai appears as a National Defense Divinity once the party reaches a later portion of Tokyo.
In the anime and light novels Mirage of Blaze, Tenkai's name has been mentioned in a crucial part of the story arc, being that an old incantation of his that he had invoked centuries ago would be the key for Lord Kagetora Uesugi and his team to stop their enemies in controlling the Feudal Underworld and the living world.
He appears in the mobile game Fate/Grand Order as an antagonist of the event GUDAGUDA Imperial Capital Grail. He is truly Akechi Mitsuhide and he quickly reveals his identity.
He appears in the game "Nioh" and "Nioh 2", which represents him like an old and powerful onmyo mage that helps you during the storyline to fight yokai demons and bans them with magic from our dimension.

Gallery

References
KITAIN site 
Kaneiji Temple(Japanese)
Kaneiji Temple(English)
Tokyo government (IPA, an agency of the Government of Japan) 
Nikko Sightseeing association official website 

Japanese Buddhist clergy
Japanese centenarians
1536 births
1643 deaths
Edo period Buddhist clergy
Men centenarians